Gerhard Mertins (30 December 1919 – 19 March 1993) was a German paratrooper, post-war arms dealer and German Intelligence operative. In 1943, he participated in the Gran Sasso raid rescuing Benito Mussolini from prison.

According to Manuel Contreras, he allegedly supplied the Pinochet regime with arms and helicopters. In 1976, he and Manuel Contreras traveled to Tehran to offer the Shah regime help in killing Carlos the Jackal.

Awards
Knight's Cross of the Iron Cross on 6 December 1944 as Hauptmann and leader of Fallschirm-Pionier-Bataillon 5

References

Citations

Bibliography

 

1919 births
1993 deaths
Fallschirmjäger of World War II
Recipients of the Knight's Cross of the Iron Cross
Federal Intelligence Service informants
Recipients of the Gold German Cross
German businesspeople
Military personnel from Berlin